In enzymology, a phosphomannan mannosephosphotransferase is an enzyme that catalyzes the chemical reaction

GDP-mannose + (phosphomannan)n  GMP + (phosphomannan)n+1

Thus, the two substrates of this enzyme are GDP-mannose and (phosphomannan)n, whereas its two products are GMP and (phosphomannan)n+1.

This enzyme belongs to the family of transferases, specifically those transferring non-standard substituted phosphate groups.  The systematic name of this enzyme class is GDP-mannose:phosphomannan mannose phosphotransferase.

References

 

EC 2.7.8
Enzymes of unknown structure